Evison is a surname. Notable people by that name include:

 Frank Evison (1922–2005), New Zealand geophysicist.
 Pat Evison (1924–2010), New Zealand actress.
 Peter Evison (born 1964), English darts player.
 Jonathan Evison (born 1968), American writer.
 Ryan Evison (born 1987), New Zealand hydrologist.
 Joey Evison (born 2001, English cricketer